Gabungan Sepakbola Wanita Persipura, or Galanita Persipura, is an Indonesia professional Women's football club based in Tolikara, Papua Province, Indonesia. Founded in 2019, the club is affiliated with men's professional association football club Persipura. It currently plays in the Liga 1 Putri, the top women's league in Indonesia.

History
In July 2019, Persipura Jayapura announced their commitment to take part in the inaugural season of Liga 1 Putri, a women's football competition in Indonesia and formed a women's football team.

Players

Current squad

References

Association football clubs established in 2019
Women's football clubs in Indonesia
Persipura Jayapura